George Milligan (?–9 March 1799) was a Scottish surgeon. 

From Ayrshire, Scotland, in 1753 Milligan became Surgeon to His Majesty's Troops in South Carolina and began practicing medicine in Charleston. He was elected as a member to the American Philosophical Society in 1772. 

Upon the outbreak of the Revolutionary War, he served as Surgeon of the Royal Garrison Battalion. A staunch loyalist and servant to the Crown, he reported that a mob harassed him and his wife, and ultimately forced them to escape Charleston in 1775. 

He returned to Britain and died in Dumfries, Scotland.

References

1799 deaths
Loyalists in the American Revolution
Members of the American Philosophical Society
Scottish surgeons
People from Ayrshire
18th-century Scottish medical doctors